Cracker Night is an Australian comedy television gala event sponsored by the Comedy Channel, executive produced by the Comedy Channel programming director Darren Chau, and produced by Elia Eliades, Jorge Menidis and Total Show Productions for the Comedy Channel as part of the Sydney Comedy Festival. The gala celebrates the opening of the Sydney Comedy Festival and showcases the best local and international talent performing at the festival that year.

References

External links
 Cracker Night (2009) IMDB
 Cracker Night (2010) IMDB

Australian comedy television series
The Comedy Channel original programming
2009 Australian television series debuts
2011 Australian television series endings